Napoleon Bracy Jr. is an American politician. He serves as a Democratic member of the Alabama House of Representatives, where he represents Mobile County, Alabama. In May 2017, he opposed the bill for the Alabama Memorial Preservation Act, which would make it harder to remove Confederate monuments in Alabama; he argued, "People that sponsor bills like this don't care about me."

References

Living people
Dillard University alumni
Democratic Party members of the Alabama House of Representatives
Year of birth missing (living people)
21st-century African-American politicians
20th-century African-American people
African-American state legislators in Alabama
21st-century American politicians